George Franklin Blackerby (November 18, 1903 – March 30, 1987) was a professional baseball player.  He was an outfielder for one season (1928) with the Chicago White Sox.  For his career, he compiled a .253 batting average in 83 at-bats, with 12 runs batted in.

He was born in Luther, Oklahoma and died in Wichita Falls, Texas at the age of 83.

External links

1903 births
1987 deaths
Sportspeople from Oklahoma County, Oklahoma
Chicago White Sox players
Major League Baseball outfielders
Baseball players from Oklahoma
Waco Cubs players
Birmingham Barons players
Little Rock Travelers players
Dallas Steers players
Mobile Bears players
Knoxville Smokies players
Oakland Oaks (baseball) players
Portland Beavers players
Tulsa Oilers (baseball) players
Albany Senators players
Buffalo Bisons (minor league) players
Montreal Royals players
Rochester Red Wings players
Toronto Maple Leafs (International League) players